Davion Mintz (born June 30, 1998) is an American professional basketball player for the Capital City Go-Go of the NBA G League. He played college basketball for the Kentucky Wildcats and the Creighton Bluejays.

High school career
Mintz attended North Mecklenburg High School. He averaged 12.3 points and 2.8 assists per game as a junior, playing alongside future NC State player C. J. Bryce. As a senior, he averaged 20.7 points, 6.9 assists, 5.4 rebounds and 1.9 steals per game. Mintz led the team to a 27–3 record and earned District 9 player of the year honors from the North Carolina Basketball Coaches Association. In one playoff game, he scored 43 points. In addition to his athletic achievements, Mintz was named North Mecklenburg’s Student of the Year in the Class of 2016. Considered a three-star recruit, he committed to Creighton in October 2015, choosing the Bluejays over Tulsa and Kansas State.

College career
Mintz averaged 3.3 points and 1.8 assists per game as a freshman and became the starting point guard midway through the season. As a sophomore, Mintz averaged 6.1 points and 3.1 assists per game. He averaged 9.7 points, 3 assists and 3 rebounds per game as a junior. Mintz suffered a high ankle sprain in the preseason, and announced in December 2019 that he planned to take a redshirt year. He opted to transfer to Kentucky for his graduate season. Mintz primarily played shooting guard but moved to point guard for his final three games, during which he averaged 15.3 points and 7.7 assists per game. As a graduate student, Mintz led Kentucky in scoring and assists with 11.5 points and 3.1 assists per game, while also averaging 3.2 rebounds per game. Following the season, he declared for the 2021 NBA draft, but ultimately returned to Kentucky for his sixth season of eligibility, granted due to the COVID-19 pandemic. Mintz averaged 8.5 points, 2.2 rebounds, and 1.8 assists per game.

Professional career

Capital City Go-Go (2022–present)
After going undrafted in the 2022 NBA draft, Mintz signed an Exhibit 10 deal with the Washington Wizards. He was subsequently waived during training camp. On November 4, 2022, Mintz was named to the opening night roster for the Capital City Go-Go.

Career statistics

College

|-
| style="text-align:left;"| 2016–17
| style="text-align:left;"| Creighton
| 29 || 12 || 12.2 || .385 || .360 || .788 || 1.1 || 1.8 || .5 || .1 || 3.3
|-
| style="text-align:left;"| 2017–18
| style="text-align:left;"| Creighton
| 33 || 32 || 21.1 || .404 || .352 || .732 || 3.2 || 3.1 || .4 || .1 || 6.1
|-
| style="text-align:left;"| 2018–19
| style="text-align:left;"| Creighton
| 35 || 35 || 28.9 || .416 || .347 || .723 || 3.0 || 3.0 || 1.1 || .1 || 9.7
|-
| style="text-align:left;"| 2019–20
| style="text-align:left;"| Creighton
| style="text-align:center;" colspan="11"|  Redshirt
|-
| style="text-align:left;"| 2020–21
| style="text-align:left;"| Kentucky
| 25 || 21 || 30.8 || .397 || .378 || .656 || 3.2 || 3.1 || 1.0 || .2 || 11.5
|-
| style="text-align:left;"| 2021–22
| style="text-align:left;"| Kentucky
| 31 || 6 || 24.7 || .382 || .344 || .701 || 2.2|| 1.8 || 0.6 || .1 || 8.5
|- class="sortbottom"
| style="text-align:center;" colspan="2"| Career
| 153 || 106 || 23.5 || .401 || .356 || .72 || 2.5 || 2.5 || .7 || .1 || 7.8

Personal life
Mintz's godfather is former NFL player Randy Moss.

References

External links
Kentucky Wildcats bio
Creighton Bluejays bio

1998 births
Living people
American men's basketball players
Basketball players from North Carolina
People from Gastonia, North Carolina
Point guards
Creighton Bluejays men's basketball players
Kentucky Wildcats men's basketball players